Pierre-Victor Galland (Geneva, 15 July 1822 – Paris, 30 November 1892) was a French decorative painter.

Until the age of 16, Galland studied metalwork with his father, Jacques Galland, a goldsmith. He then joined the studio of Henri Labrouste, studying architecture. After two years of training, Labrouste encouraged him to pursue his interest in decorative art under the direction of Michel Martin Drolling. In 1843, the decorative painter Pierre-Luc-Charles Ciceri (1782–1868) hired Galland to assist with the painting of figures, flowers, fruit, and garlands. In 1848, he again worked with Labrouste, in 1848, on the decoration of the Fête de la Concorde.

Galland was responsible for the ceiling of the grand staircase at Dartmouth House in Mayfair, London, England.

Marcel de Chollet was one of his students at the École nationale supérieure des Beaux-Arts.

Bibliography 
 Pierre-Victor Galland, Un Tiepolo français au XIXe siècle. Published in 2006, Somogy, Piscine-musée d'art et d'industrie André Diligent, Musée départemental de l'Oise (Paris, Roubaix, Beauvais). .

References

External links 
 Pierre-Victor Galland on artnet
 Pierre-Victor Galland, 1822–1892 books from the Open Library
 Exposition: Pierre-Victor Galland. Un Tiepolo français au XIXe siècle 
 Mobilier national collections

1822 births
1892 deaths
19th-century French painters
French male painters
Artists from Geneva
19th-century French male artists